Roderick Reid (born 10 January 1970) is a former Jamaican international footballer.

Career statistics

International

International goals
Scores and results list Jamaica's goal tally first.

References

1970 births
Living people
Jamaican footballers
Jamaica international footballers
Association football midfielders
Association football forwards
1991 CONCACAF Gold Cup players
1993 CONCACAF Gold Cup players